Khvajeh Vali-ye Sofla (also Romanized as Khvājeh Valī-ye Soflá; also known as Khvājeh Valī-ye Pā’īn and Khājeh Valī-e Pā’īn) is a village in Behnamvasat-e Jonubi Rural District, Javadabad District, Varamin County, Tehran Province, Iran. At the 2006 census, its population was 75, in 20 families.

References 

Populated places in Varamin County